McCabe & Mrs. Miller is a 1971 American revisionist Western film directed by Robert Altman and starring Warren Beatty and Julie Christie. The screenplay by Altman and Brian McKay is based on the 1959 novel McCabe by Edmund Naughton. Altman referred to it as an "anti-Western" film because it ignores or subverts a number of Western conventions. It was filmed in British Columbia, Canada in the fall and winter of 1970, and premiered on June 24, 1971.

The film has received critical acclaim in the years since its release and earned an Oscar nomination for Christie in the Best Actress category. The film was deemed the 8th greatest Western of all time by the American Film Institute in its AFI's 10 Top 10 list in 2008 and, in 2010, was selected for preservation in the United States National Film Registry by the Library of Congress as being "culturally, historically or aesthetically significant".

Plot
In 1902 Washington state, a gambler named John McCabe arrives mysteriously and mumbling to himself in the town of Presbyterian Church, named after its only substantial building, a tall but mostly unused chapel. McCabe quickly takes a dominant position over the town's simple-minded and lethargic miners, thanks to his aggressive personality and rumors that he is a gunfighter. McCabe establishes a makeshift brothel, consisting of three prostitutes purchased for $200 from a pimp in the nearby town of Bearpaw. British cockney Constance Miller arrives in town and tells him she could run a brothel for him more profitably. The two become financially successful business partners, open a higher-class establishment including a bathhouse for hygiene, and a romantic relationship develops between the two, though she charges him for sex.

As the town becomes richer, Sears and Hollander, a pair of agents from the Harrison Shaughnessy Mining Company in Bearpaw, arrive to buy out McCabe's business, as well as the surrounding zinc mines. Shaughnessy is notorious for having people killed when they refuse to sell. McCabe does not want to sell at their initial price of $5,500, but he overplays his hand in the negotiations in spite of Mrs. Miller's warnings that he is underestimating the violence that will ensue if they do not take the money.

Three bounty hunters – Butler, Breed and Kid – are dispatched by the mining company to kill McCabe, as well as make an example of him, but he refuses to abandon the town. Clearly afraid of the gunmen when they arrive in town, McCabe initially tries to appease them. Butler confronts him about his earlier story that he is successful gunfighter "Pudgy McCabe", who shot someone in a card game. After hearing McCabe's story, with the addition that the gun was a Derringer, Butler proclaims that McCabe has never killed anyone in his life. McCabe later tries to find Sears and Hollander to try to settle on a price, but upon learning that they have left the area, he visits lawyer Clement Samuels to try to obtain legal protection from Harrison Shaughnessy. Although the lawyer agrees to help McCabe bust the mining company's monopoly on the area, McCabe returns to town convinced that he must face the bounty hunters on his own.

When a lethal confrontation becomes inevitable, McCabe arms himself and hides in the chapel during the early morning hours, but is evicted by the armed pastor, who is then shot by the assassin Butler in a case of mistaken identity. A broken lantern starts a fire in the church and the townspeople rush to help extinguish it. McCabe continues his evasion, shooting Breed and Kid from hidden positions, killing them; unfortunately, one wounds McCabe as he falls. As the townsfolk mobilize to fight the chapel fire, McCabe plays cat-and-mouse with the last gunman, Butler. McCabe is shot in the back and mortally wounded, but feigns death and kills Butler with a Derringer when he approaches to confirm McCabe's identity. As the townspeople celebrate extinguishing the fire, McCabe dies alone in the snow, while Mrs. Miller lies sedated in an opium den.

Cast
Credits from American Film Institute:

Production

Development
McCabe & Mrs. Miller is based on Edmund Naughton's 1959 novel McCabe. David Foster, one of the film's producers, had purchased the film rights to the novel in 1968; he'd learned of the novel while negotiating with Ellen Wright (the widow of novelist Richard Wright) over the rights to The Mandarins, a novel by Simone de Beauvoir. Wright was acting as the agent for Naughton, who was then living in Paris and working for the International Herald Tribune. With his partner, Mitchell Broward, Foster then negotiated a deal with the Fox studio for two films. By October, 1968, Foster had commissioned a screenplay from Ben Maddow, a well-known poet and screenwriter.

In 1969, Altman was in post-production on M*A*S*H and snuck Foster into the screening; Foster liked the film and signed Altman to direct a film based on McCabe. They agreed to wait until M*A*S*H became a box-office hit to take the pitch for McCabe to a studio for funding. A second screenplay – independent of Maddow's – was commissioned from Brian McKay, who completed it in only five weeks. A revised version of that screenplay dated July 1970 became the "shooting script" for the film. Altman and McKay are listed in the film's credits as its screenwriters; Maddow went uncredited.

Altman offered the lead to Elliott Gould who turned it down to make I Love My Wife. "Bob said, 'You're making the mistake of your life'," said Gould. "There was a part of me that was not developed at all and that had no real understanding about what the woman is. Bob wanted to cast Patricia Quinn as Mrs. Miller, and I hadn't seen 'Alice's Restaurant' and I hadn't met her. I had some misconceptions because I wanted her to have the same relationship with Altman as I had. I recently watched 'Alice's Restaurant' and she's great. Altman was so right."

Foster called Warren Beatty in England, about the film; Beatty flew to New York City to see M*A*S*H and then flew to Los Angeles, California to sign for McCabe.

The film was originally called The Presbyterian Church Wager, after a bet placed among the church's few attendees, about whether McCabe would survive his refusal of the offer to buy his property. Altman reported that an official in the Presbyterian Church called Warner Brothers, to complain about having its church mentioned in a film about brothels and gambling. The complaint prompted a name change to John Mac Cabe but it was released as McCabe & Mrs. Miller.

Filming

The film was shot in West Vancouver and in Squamish, almost in sequential order, a rarity for film makers. The crew found a suitable location for the filming and built up the "set", as McCabe built up the town in the film. Mrs. Miller is brought into town on a J. I. Case 80 HP steam engine from 1912; the steam engine is genuine and functioning and the crew used it to power the lumbermill after its arrival. Carpenters for the film were locals and young men from the United States, fleeing conscription into the Vietnam War; they were dressed in period costume and used tools of the period, so that they could go about their business in the background, while the plot advanced in the foreground.

The crew ran buried hoses throughout the town, placed so they could create the appearance of rain. Since the city of Vancouver generally receives a great deal of rain, it was usually only necessary to turn on the hoses to make scenes shot on the rare days when it didn't rain, to match those shot on days when it did.

It began snowing near the end of shooting, when the church fire and the standoff were the only scenes left. Beatty did not want to start shooting in the snow, as it was financially risky to do so: to preserve continuity, the rest of the film would have to be shot in snow. Altman countered that since those were the only scenes left to film, it was best to start since there was nothing else to do. The "standoff" scene—which is in fact more a "cat and mouse" scene involving shooting one's enemy in the back—and its concurrent church fire scene, were shot over nine days. The heavy snow, with the exception of a few "fill-in" patches on the ground, was genuine; the crew members built snowmen and had snowball fights between takes.

The film, especially the final scene, is atypical of the western genre. The showdown between a reluctant protagonist and his enemies takes place ungracefully in the snow during the early hours, rather than at "high noon". Instead of hiding indoors and watching the battle unfold outside, the townsfolk are bustling in the streets and largely unaware of the gunfight taking place in their midst. For a distinctive look, Altman and Zsigmond chose to "flash" (pre-fog) the film negative before its eventual exposure, as well as use a number of filters on the cameras, rather than manipulate the film in post-production; in this way the studio could not force him to change the film's look to something less distinctive.

Editing 
The editing of McCabe & Mrs. Miller took much longer than its filming. Altman and Lou Lombardo, the editor and second unit director, spent nine months editing the film in North Vancouver, close to the location of the filming itself. The editing was an innovation in its time because the principal storyline about John McCabe and Constance Miller occupies relatively little of the film's running time, especially in the first half of the film. Pauline Kael emphasized this in her 1971 review of the film. She wrote,

The classical story is only a thread in the story that Altman is telling ... The people who drop in and out of the place—a primitive mining town—are not just background for McCabe and Mrs. Miller; McCabe and Mrs. Miller are simply the two most interesting people in the town, and we catch their stories in glimpses, as they interact with the other characters and each other ... Lives are picked up and let go, and the sense of how little we know about them becomes part of the texture; we generally know little about the characters in movies, but since we're assured that that little is all we need to know, and thus all there is to know, we're not bothered by it. Here we seem to be witnesses to a vision of the past ...

This aspect of the film's editing also carried through into the film's unusual sound editing, which can blend many conversations and noises and does not emphasize the principal characters. In his textbook on film production, Bruce Mamer wrote,

Robert Altman was famous for using this style of layered dialogue cutting. The frontier barroom scene that opens his McCabe & Mrs. Miller (Louis Lombardo, editor) has snippets of conversations underlying the foreground action.

Ken Dancyger describes the effect in terms of its undermining of dialogue as an element in the film,

Many characters speak simultaneously, and we are aware of the discreteness of their conversations, but as their comments bleed into those of others, the effect is to undermine the dialogue. The scene moves dialogue from the informational status it usually occupies to the category of noise. Language becomes a sound effect. When we do hear the dialogue, it is the speaker who is important rather than what is being said.

Similarly, Jay Beck writes

McCabe & Mrs. Miller represents the full-scale launch of the practice of overlapping dialogue in Altman's cinema. The visual and acoustic strategies in the film avoid foregrounding the main characters in the narrative and the audience has to work to follow the story, or stories, as they unfold.

Leonard Cohen's songs 
Other than the music occurring in the ordinary life of Presbyterian Church, the only music for the film is from three songs composed and performed by Leonard Cohen, a Canadian poet who had released his first album of songs in 1967. Their importance is emphasized by Scott Tobias, who wrote in 2014 that "The film is unimaginable to me without the Cohen songs, which function as these mournful interstitials that unify the entire movie."

Altman had liked Cohen's debut album immensely, Songs of Leonard Cohen (1967), buying additional copies of it after wearing out each vinyl record. He had then forgotten about the album. A few years later, Altman visited Paris, just after finishing shooting McCabe & Mrs. Miller, and rediscovered Cohen's album. He had Lou Lombardo, the film's editor, use the music to maintain a rhythm for the film (in effect using it as a "temp" track). He later said, "I think the reason they worked was because those lyrics were etched in my subconscious, so when I shot the scenes I fitted them to the songs, as if they were written for them."

Altman didn't expect to be able to procure rights for Cohen's music since McCabe was a Warner Brothers film and Cohen's album was released through Columbia Records. He called Cohen, expecting to trade off his recent success with M*A*S*H, but found that Cohen had no knowledge of it. Instead, Cohen had loved Altman's less popular follow-up film Brewster McCloud. Cohen arranged for his record company to license the music cheaply, even writing into the contract that sales of that album after the release of McCabe would turn some of the royalties to Altman (an arrangement which at the time was quite unusual). The three Cohen songs used in the film were "The Stranger Song", "Sisters of Mercy" and "Winter Lady". They were released together on a 7-inch single in France in 1971, and other European countries during 1972.

Reception
The film opened without advance screenings at the Criterion and Loew's Cine theaters in New York City and received bad reviews from the New York daily newspapers including Vincent Canby of The New York Times writing of a "tired symbolism" which the film was so busy pointing out "that the effect is to undercut its narrative drive and the dignity of its fiction." However, the weekly critics raved about the film including Judith Crist and Pauline Kael of The New Yorker who called it "a beautiful pipe dream of a movie—a fleeting, almost diaphanous vision of what frontier life might have been," adding, "The movie is so affecting it leaves one rather dazed." Roger Ebert gave the film four stars out of four and wrote that it "is like no other Western ever made, and with it, Robert Altman earns his place as one of the best contemporary directors." He later added the film to his "Great Movies" list, where he said "Robert Altman has made a dozen films that can be called great in one way or another, but one of them is perfect, and that one is McCabe & Mrs. Miller (1971)." Gene Siskel also awarded it four stars and called it "a brilliant film, not because of the story, but because of the way in which it is told ... To construct such delicate scenes is the hallmark of fine film making and Altman is clearly a master." Charles Champlin of the Los Angeles Times called the film "interesting" but "as uneven as the stare of a cheap mirror." Gary Arnold of The Washington Post wrote, "Once again Altman brings a special way of life casually but vibrantly alive. 'McCabe' is an imaginative triumph partly in a visible, technical sense—a meticulous, conventionally authentic reconstruction of a frontier town—but principally in an emotional sense—a deeply felt and stirring romantic vision of frontier society."

On review aggregator Rotten Tomatoes, the film holds an approval rating of 84% based on 58 reviews, with an average score of 8.70/10. The website's critical consensus reads, "McCabe & Mrs. Miller offers revisionist Western fans a landmark early addition to the genre while marking an early apogee for director Robert Altman." On Metacritic, the film received a score of 93 based on 17 reviews, indicating "universal acclaim".

Julie Christie's performance was nominated for the Academy Award for Best Actress. Vilmos Zsigmond's cinematography received a nomination by the British Academy Film Awards, and the film's screenplay garnered a Writers Guild of America nomination. In June 2008, the American Film Institute revealed its AFI's 10 Top 10—the best ten films in ten "classic" American film genres—after polling over 1,500 people from the creative community. McCabe & Mrs. Miller was acknowledged as the eighth best film in the Western genre.

McCabe & Mrs. Miller received five votes in the British Film Institute's 2012 Sight & Sound polls, and in a later BBC poll was voted the 16th greatest American film ever made. In a 2009 interview, the film critic A.O. Scott named it one of his five favorite films.

In 2010, McCabe & Mrs. Miller was selected for preservation in the United States National Film Registry by the Library of Congress as being "culturally, historically or aesthetically significant".

Box office
With poor initial reviews, the film did not perform well at the box office in New York, but it was more successful in other parts of the country. Warner Bros., encouraged by Beatty, rereleased the film at the Coronet Theatre in New York in August 1971 along with a new advertising campaign, and its box-office performance improved upon that of the original release.

The film earned an estimated $4 million in theatrical rentals in the United States and Canada.

Awards and nominations

Home media 
Warner Home Video released a Region 1 DVD in 2002. The Criterion Collection released a 4K digital transfer of the film on Blu-ray and DVD on October 11, 2016.

See also
 List of American films of 1971

References

Further reading
 Review of the Blu-ray release of the film, and also an essay on the film's originality. Bowen uses metaphors from music and painting: "scenes are charged with a jazz-like pulse of controlled spontaneity that would become an Altman trademark. ... One returns to painting and music to establish proper contextualizing corollaries, as they tap emotion within us that can't be entirely tethered to experience and perspective. Altman called himself a painter, and the word applies not only to the craftsmanship of his images, but to their bottomless figurative nuance."
  Retrospective essay on the role of Cohen's music for the film.
 An extended appreciation of the film in the broader context of film in the late 20th century.
 A 216-page book on the film by Robert T. Self, an English professor at Northern Illinois University who has also written a biography of Altman.

External links
 McCabe & Mrs. Miller essay  by Dr. Chelsea Wessels on the National Film Registry website 
 
 
 
 
 
 McCabe & Mrs. Miller: Showdowns an essay by Nathaniel Rich at the Criterion Collection
 McCabe & Mrs. Miller essay by Daniel Eagan In America's Film Legacy, 2009-2010: A Viewer's Guide To The 50 Landmark Movies Added To The National Film Registry In 2009-10, Bloomsbury Publishing USA, 2011,  Pages 131-134 

1971 films
1970s English-language films
Films about prostitution in the United States
Films about gambling
Fictional couples
Films directed by Robert Altman
Films set in 1902
Films set in Washington (state)
Films shot in Vancouver
United States National Film Registry films
1971 Western (genre) films
American Western (genre) films
Films based on American novels
Revisionist Western (genre) films
1970s American films
Films shot in British Columbia
Warner Bros. films